Tristan is a Knight of the Round Table in Arthurian legend.

Tristan may also refer to:

Places
 Tristan (Guinea), the largest island in the Tristan and Capken Islands
 Tristan da Cunha, a British volcanic island and eponymous archipelago in the mid-south Atlantic, often shortened to "Tristan"
 Tristan Island or the Île Tristan, located at the mouth of the Pouldavid Estuary off the French port of Douarnenez in south-western Brittany
 Tristan hotspot, a volcanic hotspot which is responsible for the volcanic activity which forms the volcanoes in the southern Atlantic Ocean

Literature
 Tristan, a 12th-century French poem by Thomas of Britain
 Tristan, a 12th-century French poem by Béroul
 Tristan, a 13th-century German poem by Gottfried von Strassburg
 Tristan (novella), a 1903 novella by Thomas Mann
The Tristan Betrayal, a novel by Robert Ludlum
 Prose Tristan (Tristan en prose), an adaptation of the Tristan and Iseult story into a long prose romance

Music
 Tristan (musician) or Tristan Cooke (born 1970), British psytrance and Goa trance DJ and producer
 Tristan D (born Tristan Dorian, 1988), British Trance DJ and EDM
 Tristan (Henze), composition for piano, tape and orchestra by Hans Werner Henze
 "Tristan" (song), by Patrick Wolf from his second album Wind in the Wires
 Tristan und Isolde, an opera by Richard Wagner
 The Tristan chord, a variant on the half-diminished chord

Science and Technology
 Tristan (dinosaur), a Tyrannosaurus rex specimen
 TRISTAN, a particle accelerator at KEK in Japan

Other uses
 Tristan (name), a moderately common male given name
 Tristan (horse), a British Thoroughbred racehorse

See also
 
 
 Tristan and Iseult (disambiguation)
 Tristam (disambiguation)
 Tristram (disambiguation)
 Tristrant, a 13th-century German poem by Eilhart von Oberge
 Sir Tristrem